Horní Maršov is a municipality and village in Trutnov District in the Hradec Králové Region of the Czech Republic. It has about 1,000 inhabitants. It lies in the Giant Mountains.

Administrative parts
Villages of Dolní Albeřice, Dolní Lysečiny, Horní Albeřice, Horní Lysečiny and Temný Důl are administrative parts of Horní Maršov.

Geography
It lies in the Giant Mountains. Most of the municipal territory lies in the Krkonoše National Park. The Úpa river flows through the municipality.

History
During the German occupation of Czechoslovakia in the World War II, the Germans established and operated the E584 forced labour subcamp of the Stalag VIII-B/344 prisoner-of-war camp in the village.

Sights
The Church of the Assumption of the Virgin Mary is the landmark of Horní Maršov. This neo-Gothic parish church was built by Josef Schulz in 1895–1899.

The Horní Maršov Castle belongs to the most valuable buildings of the village. It was built in the late Baroque style in 1792. In 1869, it was rebuilt in the Neorenaissance style and the tower was added.

References

External links

Villages in Trutnov District